"Sexual Feeling" is a 1990 single by American singer La Toya Jackson.

Song information 
The song was recorded in Milan, Italy in April 1990. Her manager, Jack Gordon, was approached by producers Franco and Claudio Donato who wanted La Toya for a sexy, "moan-and-groan" track.

Three mixes of the song were included on the original release. The "Rapsody Version" included a rap by La Toya and the "Vocal Version" was used as a track on La Toya's Bad Girl album, first released in 1991 through Sherman Records. The "Sex Vocal" is an a capella track.

The "La Toya" remix was produced by Quincy Lizer and released as a single in 1990 throughout Italy and the Netherlands.

Versions

Original version
"Sexual Feeling (Vocal Version)"  	5:30
"Sexual Feeling (Rapsody Version)"  	5:30
"Sexual Feeling (Sex Vocal)"  	4:00

"La Toya" Remix
"Sexual Feeling 'La Toya' Remix (Radio Version)"  	3:28  	
"Sexual Feeling 'La Toya' Remix" 	6:03 	
"Sexual Feeling 'La Toya' Remix (Instrumental)" 	5:16 	
"Sexual Feeling "La Toya" Remix (Acapella)"  	2:28

2010 Remix
 "Sexual Feeling" (Brando Menella remix)  8:10

References 

1990 singles
La Toya Jackson songs
1990 songs
Songs written by La Toya Jackson